Cunninghame is a former comital district of Scotland and also a district of the Strathclyde Region from 1975 to 1996.

Historic Cunninghame
The origin of the name (along with the surname Cunningham) is uncertain. The ending -hame is Old English  ("home, village"). The first component may be either Old English ,  ("king") or Gaelic  ("rabbit"). Irvine, a former capital of Scotland, was the capital of Cunninghame, indicating its status as a royal burgh. The family crest includes the unicorn, which is restricted to the Crown, and Clans Cunningham, Oliphant, and Ramsay.

The historic district of Cunninghame was bordered by the districts of Renfrew and Clydesdale to the north and east respectively, by the district of Kyle to the south over the River Irvine and by the Firth of Clyde to the west.

Cunninghame became one of the three districts  or bailieries of Ayrshire, the shire or sheriffdom of Ayr. Cunninghame was in the north, along the River Irvine; Kyle was in the centre, along the River Ayr; and Carrick was in the south, along the River Doon. By the eighteenth century Ayrshire had become one of the counties of Scotland, with the three bailieries being described as "districts" or "divisions" of the county, although they had no formal administrative existence.

In the late nineteenth century the "territorial division" was described as comprising the civil parishes of Ardrossan, Beith, Dalry, Dreghorn, Fenwick, Irvine, North Ayrshire, Kilbirnie, West Kilbride, Kilmarnock, Kilmaurs, Kilwinning, Largs, Loudoun, Stevenston, Stewarton and part of Dunlop.

The Cunninghame poor law combination was formed in the 1850s with a poorhouse at Irvine but had a different area from the ancient district.

Local government district

The Cunninghame name was revived for a local government district created in 1975 under the Local Government (Scotland) Act 1973, which established a two-tier structure of local government across Scotland comprising upper-tier regions and lower-tier districts. Cunninghame was one of nineteen districts created within the region of Strathclyde. The district covered the whole area of three former districts from the historic county of Buteshire and nine former districts from Ayrshire, plus small parts of a further two districts within the designated area for Irvine New Town:
Ardrossan Burgh
Arran District
Ayr District (part within designated area of Irvine New Town)
Cumbrae District
Irvine Burgh
Irvine District
Kilbirnie District
Kilmarnock District (part within designated area of Irvine New Town)
Kilwinning Burgh
Millport Burgh
Largs Burgh
Saltcoats Burgh
Stevenston Burgh
West Kilbride District
Arran, Cumbrae and Millport were from Buteshire, the rest were from Ayrshire.

The district was abolished in 1996 by the Local Government etc. (Scotland) Act 1994 which replaced regions and districts with unitary council areas. North Ayrshire council area was formed with identical boundaries to Cunninghame District. The name Cunninghame is still used for two constituencies in the Scottish Parliament, namely Cunninghame North and Cunninghame South.

Political control
The first election to the district council was held in 1974, initially operating as a shadow authority alongside the outgoing authorities until it came into its powers on 16 May 1975. Political control of the council from 1975 was as follows:

Premises

The council was based at Cunnninghame House on Friars Croft in Irvine, which was purpose-built for the council and completed in 1975, forming part of the new town centre for Irvine following its designation as a New Town. Following the district's abolition in 1996 the building has been the headquarters of North Ayrshire Council.

Coat of arms
The Cunninghame District Council was granted a coat of arms by Lord Lyon King of Arms in 1979. The main feature of the arms was a black "shakefork" from the arms of Clan Cunningham. To the left was the arms of the former royal burgh of Irvine, based on the crest of the royal arms of Scotland, and said to have been granted to the town by King David I. To the right was an ancient ship which had appeared in the arms of both Bute County Council and Arran District Council. Above the shakefork was a leopard's head holding in its mouth a weaver's shuttle. this represented the weaving industry of the inland parts of the district. Such an emblem appeared in Scottish arms grants to weaving societies and associations, and in the armorial bearings of the Worshipful Company of Weavers of the City of London. The motto was Sense and Worth, and the arms were completed by a gold coronet of a design reserved by Lord Lyon to district councils, topped by thistle-heads.

See also
 Subdivisions of Scotland
 The Scottish feudal barony of Grougar

References

External links
Blaeu Atlas of Scotland, 1654
Counties of Scotland, 1580-1928
John Thomson's Atlas of Scotland, 1832

North Ayrshire
Districts of Scotland